The NC Dinos are a South Korean professional baseball team based in Changwon. They are a member of the KBO League. Since 2019, their home stadium is Changwon NC Park. NC Dinos are owned by video game developer NCSoft Corporation.

History
On 1 July 2010, the cities of Changwon, Masan and Jinhae were integrated into one city, Changwon. As a result of the integration, Changwon became the eleventh largest city in South Korea. Afterward, Changwon drove forward the project, which attracted a baseball team in the city. On 22 December 2010, video game company NCSoft submitted a plan that it wanted to found a baseball team that would be later admitted to the Korea Baseball Organization as a member franchise. Changwon hereby became the first city having a baseball team among all the non-metropolitan cities in South Korea.

In the 2012 season, NC Dinos competed in the unaffiliated Freedom Division of the Korea Baseball Futures League. On 8 May 2012, the Korea Baseball Organization officially approved NC Dinos' admission to the KBO League for the 2013 season.

On 11 April 2013, the NC Dinos won their first game in the club's history against the LG Twins.

As a new team in 2013, the Dinos were allowed three foreign players on their roster (as opposed to the usual two). In 2014, that limit was raised to four (while all non-expansion teams were limited to three). The 2014 Dinos signed pitchers Charlie Shirek, Eric Hacker, Thad Weber, and outfielder Eric Thames.

In November 2020, the Dinos won their first Korean Series championship, four games to two games over the Doosan Bears. This followed the team's first regular season championship, in which the Dinos finished the 2020 regular season in first place for the first time in the team's history.

Season-by-season records

Team

Current roster

Managers 
Kim Kyung-moon (2012–2018)
You Young-jun (2018) (caretaker)
Lee Dong-wook (2019–2022)
Kang In-kwon (2022–present)

Mascot
The NC Dinos have two mascots. Sseri is a green Brontosaurus that wears a necklace and has affectionately been nicknamed "Swole Daddy" by SB Nation. The Dinos' other mascot, Dandi, is a blue Tyrannosaurus.

References
General

Specific

External links

  
  

 
KBO League teams
Sport in Changwon
Sports teams in South Gyeongsang Province
Baseball teams established in 2011
2011 establishments in South Korea
NCSoft